Berri Football Club (commonly known as The Demons) is an Australian rules football club playing in the Riverland Football League (RFL) in South Australia. The club has an illustrious history winning many premierships, most recently the A-Grade in 2010.

The Club
The Berri Football Club headquarters is also the RFL headquarters. The current coach is Clint Ridgeway and the captain is Evan Penaluna. The president of the club is Ronald Foulds.

In 2002, the club won the RFL premiership, coming from eight goals down in the second quarter to secure the greatest comeback in an RFL grand final. The club was captained by Sam Ingerson in that year. In 2010 they defeated arch rivals Barmera-Monash to win premiership after finishing on top of the table.

Rivalry
The club shares a rivalry with Barmera/Monash and competes once a year in the Fisher Cup, named after Bob Fisher, who played with both clubs.

Premierships

1913, 1919, 1920, 1921, 1923, 1925, 1929, 1930, 1931, 1933, 1935, 1938, 1939, 1952, 1954, 1966, 1967, 1968, 1972, 1973, 1975, 1980, 1992, 2002, 2010

VFL/AFL Players
Tom Waye - 
Rhys Stanley - , 
Jack Wade - South Melbourne
Kaiden Brand - , 
Malcom Hill Fitzroy

Books
The encyclopedia of South Australian Country Football Clubs. Peter Lines 

Australian rules football clubs established in 1909
1909 establishments in Australia
Australian rules football clubs in South Australia